José Luis Mosquera Moreno (born 14 March 1995) is a Colombian professional footballer who plays as a defender for Bangladesh Premier League club AFC Uttara.

References

1995 births
Living people
Colombian footballers
Boyacá Chicó F.C. footballers
Leones F.C. footballers
Categoría Primera A players
Categoría Primera B players
A Lyga players
Colombian expatriate footballers
Expatriate footballers in Lithuania
Colombian expatriate sportspeople in Lithuania
Association football defenders
Sportspeople from Antioquia Department